Puti may refer to:

 , an Indonesian title of nobility denoting Minangkabau origin
 Puti (film), a Filipino psychological thriller
 Puti Kaisar-Mihara, Austrian model of Minangkabau descent
 Puti Tipene Watene, New Zealand politician

Offensive Word 

 Puti (पुती), is an offensive Nepalese word which is also used to describe vagina.

See also 
 Bodhi Tree
 Putti (disambiguation)